"Veneno" is a song by Brazilian singer Anitta from her extended play, Solo. It was written by Anitta, Tainy, Eduardo Vargas and Camilo Echeverry, and produced by Tainy and Dynell. It was released as the extended play's lead single on 9 November 2018 through Warner Music Brasil.

Background and release
On June 20, 2018, with the launch of Instagram's new video platform, Anitta announced she would begin promoting her next single by showing the process of picking up a single using the format of a webseries. Anitta was in doubt between the then-unreleased tracks "Medicina"" and  "Veneno" to release as the follow-up single to "Indecente". A total of 8 chapters were released for the webseries and it showcased marketing estrategies, the making of the music videos for "Medicina" and "Veneno", interviews with the writers and producers of both tracks and a voting which included Warner Music executives, both Anitta's Brazilian and international teams, as well as other artists such as Alesso, Lele Pons and Rudy Mancuso. "Medicina" was ultimately chosen to be released as a single on July 20, 2018.  Anitta later confirmed that she wanted "Veneno" to be released before "Medicina" but assured that the first would be released in a later moment because she loves the song and "the video was too expensive".

In October, 2018, while being interview by Billboard on the red carpet of 2018 MTV Europe Music Awards, Anitta announced the release of an extended play containing songs in English, Spanish and Portuguese, later revealed to be titled Solo, set to be released on November 9, 2018, which would include "Veneno", a Pharrell Williams-produced English track titled "Goals" and the Portuguese song "Não perco meu tempo". Following the release of the extended play, Anitta released both "Veneno" and "Não perco meu tempo" as singles simultaneously, while the first was aimed at the Latin/Spanish market and the latter one at the Brazilian market.

Music video
The official music video for "Veneno" was directed by João Papa and released alongside the music videos for "Goals" and "Não perco meu tempo" on November 9, 2018, the same day the extended play Solo was released to streaming services and online stores. The video showcases Anitta performing among snakes and according to Billboard, the video "has powerful scenes" and "represent how “bad girl” [Anitta] can be".

Charts

Weekly charts

Monthly charts

Year-end charts

Certifications

References

2018 songs
2018 singles
Spanish-language songs
Latin pop songs
Reggaeton songs
Anitta (singer) songs
Songs written by Anitta (singer)
Songs written by Tainy
Songs written by Camilo (singer)